Robert Leron LeBlanc (born November 5, 1962) is a former American football linebacker who played one season in the National Football League (NFL) for the Buffalo Bills. He played college football at Coffeyville Community College and Elon.

Early life and education
LeBlanc was born on November 5, 1962, in Panama City, Florida. He attended Shawnee Mission South High School in Overland Park, Kansas, graduating in c. 1983. He first played college football for Coffeyville Community College, spending the 1983 and 1984 seasons there before transferring to Elon University. He played two years there, from 1985 to 1986, at linebacker, before graduating in 1987.

Professional career
After going unselected in the 1987 NFL Draft, LeBlanc was signed as an undrafted free agent by the Dallas Cowboys, only to be released when he failed a physical test.

LeBlanc moved to the Canadian Football League (CFL) later in the year, being signed by the Calgary Stampeders to their practice roster on August 14.

He left the Stampeders during the 1987 NFL strike to be signed by the Buffalo Bills. He was named starter for their game against the Indianapolis Colts, and made his professional debut in the 47–6 loss. He appeared in a total of three games, each as a starter, before being released.

References

1962 births
Living people
American football linebackers
Buffalo Bills players
Calgary Stampeders players
Coffeyville Red Ravens football players
Dallas Cowboys players
Elon Phoenix football players
National Football League replacement players
New York Jets players
Sportspeople from Overland Park, Kansas
People from Panama City, Florida
Players of American football from Kansas